Milan Nakonečný (born 8 February 1932 in Horažďovice) is Czech psychologist, professor of psychology and historian. During the normalization, Nakonečný was banned from teaching and publishing.

Books (selected) 
 Motivace lidského chování (1997) 
 Psychologie osobnosti (1998) 
 Encyklopedie obecné psychologie (1997) 
 Lexikon magie (1993) 
 Lexikon psychologie (1995) 
 Novodobý český hermetismus (1995) 
 Psychologie osobnosti (1995) 
 Základy psychologie osobnosti (1993) 
 Úvod do sociální psychologie
 Motivace pracovního jednání a její řízení (1992) 
 Emoce a motivace (1973)
 Sociální psychologie (1970)
 Martinismus (1991) 
 Základní otázky psychologie (1968)
 Sociální psychologie (1999) 
 Základy psychologie (1998) 
 Průvodce dějinami psychologie (1995) 
 Lidské emoce (2000) 
 Úvod do psychologie (2003) 
 Psychologie téměř pro každého (2004) 
 Sociální psychologie organizace (2005) 
 Vlajka: k historii a ideologii českého nacionalismu (2001) 
 Český fašismus (2006) 
 Motivace lidského chování (1996) 
 Magie v historii, teorii a praxi (1999) 
 František Mareš (2007)

References

1932 births
Living people
People from Horažďovice
Czech psychologists
21st-century Czech historians
Academic staff of Charles University
20th-century Czech historians